A Mars aircraft is a vehicle capable of sustaining powered flight in the atmosphere of Mars. So far, the Mars helicopter Ingenuity is the only object to ever fly on Mars, completing 39 successful flights covering  in 1 hour, 4 minutes and 20 seconds of flight time.

It made the first powered flight on 19 April 2021, taking off from the surface. Previously, the experimental aircraft, NASA Mini-Sniffer, was considered for possible missions to fly in and study Mars' atmosphere, but that idea was abandoned. Aircraft may provide on site measurements of the atmosphere of Mars, as well as additional observations over extended areas. A long-term goal is to develop piloted Mars aircraft.

Compared to Earth, the air on Mars is much thinner at the surface, with pressure less than 1% of Earth's at sea level, requiring a more efficient method to achieve lift. Offsetting that disadvantage, Mars air, mostly consisting of carbon dioxide, is denser per unit of volume than Earth air, and gravity on Mars is less than 40% of Earth's.

History
In 1918, the Danish science fiction film Himmelskibet (aka A Trip to Mars) featured an aerospace craft called Excelsior for a crewed trip to Mars.

Before the start of Mars exploration with spacecraft, the density of Mars' atmosphere was suspected to be higher than was later measured to be, leading engineers to think that winged flight would be much easier than it actually is.  In his "Mars Project" ("Das Marsprojekt") concept, Wernher von Braun proposed winged vehicles for landing human missions on Mars.

The first detailed Mars lander contracted by NASA was to Ford/Philco  Aeronutronic in the early 1960s, which was for a lifting body design for the lander; this is when some of best estimates for the Mars atmosphere were significantly denser than revealed by the Mariner IV measurements in July 1965. The lander had a tub-shaped lifting body with winglets, and was one of the first detailed designs for Mars lander although it would not be able to fly in the revised figures for the Mars atmospheric conditions. The Aeronutronic Mars lifting-body lander design was based on Mars atmosphere of mostly nitrogen about 10% of Earth.

July 1965 marked a shift away from lifting body and winged glider style Mars landers to ballistic entry gumdrop style landers.

In the 1970s the Mini-Sniffer aircraft were made in several versions so it could also operate in an all- environment. The Mini-Sniffer could run without oxygen by using hydrazine, and the design was considered for sampling the atmosphere of Mars. The airplane had a large propeller to be effective in the thin air and many flights of various configurations were made between 1975 and 1982.

A winged rover design was proposed in the 1970s, to cover more area than the stationary Viking landers. There was a proposal by NASA in the 1990s for a Mars airplane to fly on Mars by the anniversary of the Wright Brothers's first flight, in the "Faster, Better, Cheaper" era. The ARES Mars airplane proposal was selected as a Mars Scout Program candidate, but not selected for flight.

In 2015, a Mars aircraft was considered as an option in the re-boot of the Japanese MELOS mission. One early design proposed a wing-span of 1.2m, a mass of 2.1 kg, and with the following mission profile: During the landing phase of the surface element of MELOS, the aircraft would be released at an altitude of 5 km then fly 4 minutes, covering 25 horizontal km.

On April 19, 2021, the NASA helicopter Ingenuity became the first powered and controlled Mars aircraft to take flight. It originally landed on the planet while stored under the NASA Mars rover Perseverance.

Airplanes

Prototype Mars planes have flown at close to  altitude on Earth (in roughly twice of the average air pressure at Mars' surface), and tested expandable wings that cure in ultraviolet light. For flight in Mars' atmosphere, the Reynolds number would be very low compared to flight in Earth's atmosphere. Valles Marineris was targeted for an uncrewed aircraft flight and by Mars' gliders.

Gliders could carry more scientific instrumentation, but cover less area. Hydrazine has been proposed as a fuel for Mars aircraft. At one point, NASA was developing plans for a wok-sized airplane "micromission", which would piggyback on a separate Mars bound payload.

The Daedalus proposal in the canceled Mars Scout program designed a Mars glider that would fly over  along the Coprates Chasma

Proposed Mars airplane concepts include:
ARES (Aerial Regional-scale Environmental Survey)
MAGE (Mars Airborne Geophysical Explorer)
AME (Airplane for Mars Exploration)
MATADOR (Mars Advanced Technology Airplane for Deployment, Operations and Recovery)
Sky-Sailor, solar powered airplane with micro-robots
Kitty Hawk, multi-glider mission
Daedalus, glider with 400+ km range (Mars Scout 2011 proposal)
ARMaDA, "Advanced Reconnaissance Martian Deployable Aircraft" 
MAREA, "Martial Aerial Research Euroavia Airplane"
Prandtl-M (Preliminary Research Aerodynamic Design to Land on Mars)
NASA Mini-Sniffer, considered for sampling the atmosphere of Mars, tested running on hydrazine (air independent).

Balloons
Balloons may provide an alternative to parachutes, allowing for a soft landing. A balloon could allow a lander to take off and land at a new site. Two types of balloon technology are super-pressure and Montgolfiere. The super-pressure balloons try to contain the pressure caused by heating to maintain altitude.

The Montgolfiere would use heated Martian air to create lift. An example of concept for Mars balloon was the Mars Geoscience Aerobot. Some work has been done to develop extremely thin, flexible solar cells that could allow a balloon's skin itself to generate power from the Sun.

Airships with vacuum used to create lift have also been proposed.

Rotorcraft

In 2002 a paper was published suggesting autonomous robotic helicopters for Mars exploration would be possible for the Mars Scout Program. A number of advantages of a viable rotorcraft design were noted, including the ability to pass over difficult Mars terrain yet still visit multiple sites in situ. The short hop made by Lunar Surveyor 6 in 1967 was noted as example of hopping to visit another site.

Ingenuity, part of NASA's Mars 2020 mission, is a robotic helicopter that demonstrated the first rotorcraft flight in the atmosphere of Mars. The aircraft was deployed from the Perseverance rover, and is expected to fly up to five times during its 30-day test campaign early in the mission. It will use autonomous control and communicate with Perseverance directly after each landing. It achieved the first powered flight on another planet, and NASA will be able to build on the design for future Mars missions.

Other aircraft and airborne devices

Hypersonic gliders were proposed by Wernher von Braun.
Various parachutes have been the main air-borne device
Rocket-sustained flight as in the case of retro-rockets have also been a part of landing systems
Aeroshells from various spacecraft
A rocket powered hopper (e.g. Mars Geyser Hopper)
Entomopter

Virtual
The Mars Express High Resolution Stereo Camera and the Mars Reconnaissance Orbiters HiRISE camera can both provide virtual Mars flyovers by draping surface pictures over 3D terrain models.

See also
 Aerobot
 Aerobraking
 Dragonfly, a planned rotorcraft for Saturn's moon Titan
 List of missions to Mars
 Mars atmospheric entry
 Mars flyby
 Vega program balloons, 1985, floated in the Venusian cloud system

References

External links
NASA – Planetary Flight Vehicle
NASA – ARES (multimedia)
Ultra-Efficient Aircraft Wins NASA Prize (2011) 
Flight System Options for a Long-Duration Mars Airplane (.pdf)
Ames tests Mars airplane prototype (August 2001)
What’s the Best Design for a Flying Mars Robot? (Universe Today)
Could This Become the First Mars Airplane? NASA June 2015
Virtual flyover of Candor Chasma (Candor Chasma)

Proposed spacecraft
Exploration of Mars
Astronautics